Alistair McGregor (born 11 June 1981 in Aberdeen) is a male field hockey goalkeeper from Scotland, who earned his first cap for the Men's National Team in 2001. He plays club hockey for Loughborough Students' Men's Hockey Club. McGregor was named joint Outstanding UK Player at the 2005 European Championships. He represented Great Britain at the 2008 Summer Olympics in Beijing.

References
sportscotland

External links
 

1981 births
Living people
Scottish male field hockey players
Field hockey players at the 2006 Commonwealth Games
Field hockey players at the 2008 Summer Olympics
Olympic field hockey players of Great Britain
British male field hockey players
Sportspeople from Aberdeen
Loughborough Students field hockey players
Commonwealth Games competitors for Scotland